Radical Thinkers is a series of books released through Verso Books. The series was first released in October 2005. The series shifted towards themes in set 9 and began to release more frequently with fewer titles in each set. In 2010, Minima Moralia, For Marx, Aesthetics and Politics, and Culture and Materialism were reprinted in hardback under the Radical Thinkers Classics designation as part of Verso's 40th anniversary celebration.

Links 
 Radical Thinkers series at Versobooks.com

Series of books
Radical Thinkers